Diemut Poppen (born in Münster, Germany) is a German musician.

She began violin lessons at the age of seven, but changed to the viola having been exposed to it through playing chamber music.  She has been taught by leading players such as Kim Kashkashian, Bruno Giuranna, Yuri Bashmet,  and the Amadeus Quartet. She has also studied with Frans Brüggen, Heinz Holliger and Claudio Abbado.

Poppen has been a member of the Chamber Orchestra of Europe, the Lucerne Festival Orchestra and the Orchestra Mozart.

She succeeded Nobuko Imai in her position at the Hochschule für Musik Detmold. She has been a member of the jury at several international competitions such as the ARD International Music Competition in Munich. She is also director of the Thüringische Sommerakademie (Chamber Music Summer Academy in Thuringia) and she founded the Osnabrück Chamber Music Series.

Poppen has recorded for different labels such as Deutsche Grammophon, Live Classics, Cappricio, Ondine, Ars Musici, Tudor and EMI. Her wide repertory includes the new Mijail Pletnev and Kancheli Styx concertos for viola and orchestra.

She currently teaches at the  Reina Sofía School of Music (Escuela Superior de Música Reina Sofía) in Madrid.

References 

German classical violists
German music educators
Year of birth missing (living people)
Academic staff of the Reina Sofía School of Music
Living people